Srđan Radonjić (Cyrillic: Срђан Радоњић; born 8 May 1981) is a Montenegrin former professional footballer who played as striker.

Radonjić represented Serbia and Montenegro at the 2004 Summer Olympics. He later played for the national team of Montenegro after the country declared its independence from Serbia.

Club career
Radonjić moved to Partizan in January 2004, signing a four-year contract. He remained at the club for the next three years, until January 2007. In the national championship, Radonjić scored a total of 33 goals in 57 appearances, also becoming the league's top scorer in the 2005–06 season with 20 goals.

International career
Radonjić was a member of the Serbia and Montenegro under-23 team at the 2004 Summer Olympics, which finished fourth in Group C, behind eventual gold medal winners Argentina, Australia and Tunisia.

Radonjić represented and made his debut for Montenegro at the 2007 Kirin Cup in Japan, appearing in matches against the hosts and Colombia. He has earned a total of 3 caps, scoring no goals. His final international was an August 2007 friendly match against Slovenia in Podgorica.

Statistics

Honours

Club
Partizan
 First League of Serbia and Montenegro: 2004–05
Budućnost Podgorica
 Montenegrin First League: 2011–12
 Montenegrin Cup: 2012–13
Sutjeska Nikšić
 Montenegrin First League: 2013–14

Individual
 First League of Serbia and Montenegro Top Scorer: 2005–06

Notes

References

External links

 
 
 

1981 births
Living people
Footballers from Podgorica
Association football forwards
Serbia and Montenegro footballers
Serbia and Montenegro under-21 international footballers
Olympic footballers of Serbia and Montenegro
Footballers at the 2004 Summer Olympics
Montenegrin footballers
Montenegro international footballers
FK Budućnost Podgorica players
FK Mornar players
FK Sutjeska Nikšić players
FK Partizan players
Odense Boldklub players
Viborg FF players
IK Start players
SC Rheindorf Altach players
FK Mogren players
FC Luch Vladivostok players
OFK Grbalj players
Kazma SC players
Second League of Serbia and Montenegro players
First League of Serbia and Montenegro players
Serbian SuperLiga players
Danish Superliga players
Norwegian First Division players
Austrian Football Bundesliga players
Montenegrin First League players
Russian First League players
Kuwait Premier League players
Montenegrin expatriate footballers
Expatriate footballers in Serbia
Montenegrin expatriate sportspeople in Serbia
Expatriate men's footballers in Denmark
Montenegrin expatriate sportspeople in Denmark
Expatriate footballers in Norway
Montenegrin expatriate sportspeople in Norway
Expatriate footballers in Austria
Montenegrin expatriate sportspeople in Austria
Expatriate footballers in Russia
Montenegrin expatriate sportspeople in Russia
Expatriate footballers in Kuwait
Montenegrin expatriate sportspeople in Kuwait